Gildea is a surname. 

Although spelled "Gildea", the name is pronounced "gill-day", rhyming with the Irish surname "O'Shea".

Notable people with the surname include:

Damien Gildea, (born 1969), Australian mountaineer and Antarctic explorer
the Gildea Glacier is named after him
Harry Gildea (1890–1917), Scottish footballer
James Gildea, (1838–1920), British Army officer and philanthropist
James H. Gildea, (1890–1988), American newspaperman and Democratic member of the US House of Representatives
John Gildea, Irish Gaelic footballer
Johnny Gildea, (1910–79), American football player
Lorie Skjerven Gildea, (born 1961), attorney and Chief Justice of the Minnesota Supreme Court
Peter Gildea (1883–1940), Scottish footballer
Robert Gildea, (born 1952), professor of Modern History at Oxford University
Tom Gildea, (born 1939), Irish independent politician
Willie Gildea, (born 1888), Scottish footballer

See also
 Gilday
 Kildee